The 2003 Redcar and Cleveland Borough Council election took place on 1 May 2003 to elect members of Redcar and Cleveland Unitary Council in England. The whole council was up for election with boundary changes since the last election in 1999. The Labour party lost overall control of the council to no overall control.

Background
Between 1999 and 2003 the Local Government Boundary Commission for England had made changes to the wards of the council. The changes included renaming Belmont ward to Westworth, and Redcar ward to Zetland, with 18 of the 22 wards having boundary changes.

Before the election Labour ran the council with 31 seats, compared to 14 Conservatives, 11 Liberal Democrats and 3 East Cleveland Independents. In total 151 candidates stood for the 59 seats that were being contested, an increase of 9 from the 1999 election.

The election had a trial of all postal voting to try and increase turnout, with ballots being delivered to voters 2 weeks before the election.

Election result
The count for Brotton ward was suspended on election night after 2 recounts and completed the following day. Overall turnout at the election was 51.5%, an increase from 37% in 1999.

Labour lost their majority on the council, finishing with 23 seats, 7 short of a majority. Among the Labour councillors to lose seats was the leader of the council Dave Walsh in Eston ward, after he had moved to contest Eston, instead of Loftus which he had previously been a councillor for.

Following the election Labour chose George Dunning, formerly the deputy leader, as the new leader of the party on the council, defeating Dave McLuckie by 12 votes to 11. Meanwhile, the 8 independents joined together, with Steve Kay as their leader, in an East Cleveland, Eston and Marske Independents group. After negotiations the Liberal Democrat, Conservative and Independent groups formed a coalition to take control of the council from Labour.

One East Cleveland Independent was unopposed at the election.

Ward results

References

2003 English local elections
2003
2000s in North Yorkshire